The  or NRK (based on its Romaji initials) is a confessional Lutheran denomination in Japan.  It currently has approximately 766 baptized members in 35 congregations nationwide.

The current chairman of the NRK is Rev. Shin SHIMIZU.

History

During the occupation of Japan by the Allied forces after the Second World War, several US Army chaplains affiliated with the Lutheran Church–Missouri Synod (LCMS) were serving the local population. Discussions were held with representatives from the Japan Evangelical Lutheran Church (JELC) as well as other churches on mission work in post-war Japan. With the information gathered, the LCMS came to the conclusion that they should send missionaries to northern Japan where the Lutheran presence was scarce in order to avoid redundancies among the various Lutheran churches and missions operating in Japan and a resolution was adopted accordingly.

In September 1948, the LCMS installed the first missionary to Japan and declared the start of the Japan Mission, in accordance with the resolution adopted.

The NRK was officially recognised as a religious body in Japan in 1953. Cooperation with the JELC remained close and in the same year, the NRK established School of Theology was merged with JELC's Lutheran Theological Seminary. In 1966, both the NRK and the JELC came into full communion with the adoption of the Establishment of Pulpit and Altar Fellowship and the Agreement on Cooperation in Theological Education agreements. This opened the door for the NRK's participation in activities organised by the Lutheran World Federation (LWF). In 1968, the self-governing NRK was established and it became self-supporting in 1976.

In 1997, the NRK sent a delegation to the LWF's Assembly in Hong Kong and became an associate member of the LWF in 1999. Prior to that, the NRK had already been a full member of the confessional International Lutheran Council that was constituted in 1993.

Structure & organization

The NRK is structured with a congregational polity.

Congregations by geographical regions

Hokkaidō
Hokkaidō
Congregations in the cities of Asahikawa, Ebetsu, Fukagawa, Kitami, Otaru, Sapporo, and Takikawa as well as in the towns of Iwanai and Suttsu
Tōhoku
Fukushima
Congregations in the cities of Fukushima, and Kōriyama
Kantō
Gunma
A congregation in the city of Tatebayashi
Saitama
Congregations in the cities of Hannō and Saitama
Chiba
A congregation in the city of Funabashi
Tokyo
Congregations in the wards of Adachi, Chiyoda, Minato, Ōta and Suginami as well as the city of Hino
Kanagawa
Congregations in Fujisawa, Kawasaki, and Yokohama
Chūbu
Niigata
Congregations in the cities of Nagaoka, Niigata, Sanjō, and Shibata
Kyūshū
Okinawa
A congregation in the village of Nakagusuku

Ministries

Education is emphasized as a means of communicating the Gospel. Accordingly, the NRK operates Urawa Lutheran School in Urawa and Holy Hope School in Hannō. The NRK also operates the Japan Lutheran College in cooperation with the JELC and several members of the NRK sits on the college's Board of Regents. The NRK also operates 11 kindergartens, four preschools, an elementary school, two middle schools, two secondary schools, and a Japanese and English Language Institute (both as the Lutheran Language Institute).

The Volunteer Youth Ministry (VYM) program for lay missionaries through LCMS World Mission who committed themselves for 2½ years in ministry serving as English language teachers. Most of the volunteers were young college graduates.

Affiliations & cooperation

Ecumenism

The NRK is not associated with ecumenical organizations such as the National Christian Council in Japan, the Christian Conference of Asia or the World Council of Churches. However, the NRK is a full member of the International Lutheran Council as well as an associate member of the Lutheran World Federation.

Relationship with other Lutheran churches

The work of Lutheran missionaries resulted in the establishment of five major Lutheran church bodies and a number of smaller ones, with a total membership of approximately 30,000. The largest of these, with about 20,000 members, is the JELC. Other Lutheran churches include the Kinki Evangelical Lutheran Church, the West Japan Evangelical Lutheran Church, the Japan Lutheran Brethren Church, the Japan Evangelical Lutheran Church and the Fellowship Deaconry Evangelical Church (Marburger Mission).

Cooperation among the various Lutheran churches in Japan is common, particularly with respect to outreach ministries. Church planting plans are mutually shared in order to avoid duplications.

The NRK and the JELC sponsor a joint seminary in Tokyo, the Japan Lutheran Theological Seminary while the other Lutheran seminary in Kobe is sponsored by the Kinki Evangelical Lutheran Church and the West Japan Evangelical Lutheran Church.

See also

Christianity in Japan
Protestantism in Japan

References

External links
 Japan Lutheran Church
 Omiya Zion Lutheran Church

Lutheranism in Japan
Japan
Japan
Christian organizations established in 1948
1948 establishments in Japan